is a railway station on the Takayama Main Line in the town of Hichisō, Kamo District, Gifu Prefecture, Japan, operated by Central Japan Railway Company (JR Central).

Lines

Station layout
Kamiasō Station has two opposed ground-level side platforms connected by a footbridge. The station is unattended.

Platforms

Adjacent stations

History
Kamiasō Station opened on March 20, 1924. The station was absorbed into the JR Central network upon the privatization of Japanese National Railways (JNR) on April 1, 1987.

See also

 List of Railway Stations in Japan

Railway stations in Gifu Prefecture
Takayama Main Line
Railway stations in Japan opened in 1924
Stations of Central Japan Railway Company
Hichisō, Gifu